William Barber (March 1808 – August 25, 1887) was a Canadian businessman and politician.

Early life
His family came to Canada from County Antrim in Ulster, Ireland in 1822. The four Barber brothers built a woollen mill, foundry and sawmill in Georgetown, Ontario. In 1854, they built a paper mill on the Credit River near Streetsville, Ontario. In 1888, his nephew, John Roaf Barber, upgraded the mill to use hydroelectricity power, one of the early industrial applications of electricity in Canada.

In 1862, Barber built a brick home near Streetsville, Ontario now known as The Old Barber House.

Political career
He was a member of the Legislative Assembly of Ontario for Halton from 1867 to 1875. In 1871 the Liberal Party dropped Barber as their candidate in the upcoming election, due to his support for Premier J. Sandfield Macdonald's self-described "Patent Combination" government. In his stead, the party selected William Durie Lyon and the radical 'Clear Grits' platform he championed. Despite the withdrawal of Liberal support, Barber ran as an independent and successfully fended off Lyon's challenge, largely thanks to the significant Conservative support he had acquired.

Four years after initially deselecting Barber, the Liberal Party readopted him at the 1875 election, thus preventing Lyon from contesting the riding of Halton on behalf of the party.

Following the 1875 election, he was disqualified for having induced a voter to stay home, and a byelection was held on November 15, 1875 which was won by William Durie Lyon.

Electoral record

Further reading

References

External links 
 The Barber Mills, Barberton and the Barber Brothers
 

1808 births
1887 deaths
Ontario Liberal Party MPPs
People from County Antrim
People from the Regional Municipality of Halton
Pre-Confederation Canadian businesspeople
Pre-Confederation Ontario people
Canadian people of Ulster-Scottish descent
Irish emigrants to pre-Confederation Ontario
Immigrants to Upper Canada